George Hennet (1799–1857) was an English railway engineer and contractor. He undertook many contracts for Isambard Kingdom Brunel's broad gauge railways in the South West of England and funded the provision of extra facilities on the South Devon Railway, these formed the basis of a general trading business that he conducted.

Domestic life
George Hennet was born in May 1799 in York. His early career was as a school master but he developed a talent for surveying. In 1829 he married Rosamond Follet, daughter of a timber merchant from Topsham, Devon.

During his work for Brunel he was living in London, close to Brunel's offices, but later moved to an address in Bristol near Temple Meads station. About 1849 he moved further west to Teignmouth in Devon from where he could better manage his contracts with the South Devon Railway. He owned a house called "Fonthill" in Shaldon, on the other side of the River Teign, and took an active part in the life of Teignmouth.

In 1853 he was declared bankrupt, owing about £350,000. His trading business continued for some years but his railway maintenance contract was cancelled and he had to sell much of his property in Dawlish and Teignmouth.

He died following a heart attack on 20 April 1857.

Railways
Hennet's first railway work was for George Stephenson. Working on his railways allowed him to develop his engineering knowledge and he gained membership of the Institution of Civil Engineers in 1831. About six years later he undertook some work for Isambard Brunel, helping with the survey of the Great Western Railway which he was building from London to Bristol. He then obtained a contract to lay the track on part of this line, followed by similar contracts on the Bristol and Gloucester Railway, Cheltenham and Great Western Union Railway, and Oxford and Great Western Railway.

He was awarded a contract to construct the track on the South Devon Railway in 1844 but latter received additional contracts for wooden viaducts, bridges and stations. Further contracts were won for supplying and laying the pipes necessary for the atmospheric traction system and to build the engine houses for the atmospheric pumps and boilers. These contracts amounted to over £400,000, about 20% of the total cost of the railway, and Hennet was able to buy back many of the atmospheric pipes for scrap once they were made redundant by its premature abandonment. Once the line was open he also supplied some of the stock that ran on the line, was awarded a five-year maintenance contract. In 1851 he won a new contract for doubling the line near Totnes railway station. In 1853 the staff who had worked for Hennet were transferred to the Railway who then undertook their own engineering.

Bridgwater works
After he won the contract to supply the atmospheric pipes he bought an ironworks at Bridgwater in Somerset to undertake the work and, later, to build rolling stock for several railways. This location allowed the import by boat of raw materials from Wales and the dispatch of finished work to south Devon using the Bristol and Exeter Railway. The carriage workshops for the latter were on an adjacent site.

The works passed to his son and then traded as Hennet, Spink & Else. Some of the ironwork was produced for the Royal Albert Bridge at Saltash, Cornwall. In 1873 it became the Bridgwater Engineering Company Limited but this failed in 1878.

South Devon Railway depots

Hennet was married to the daughter of a timber merchant and started dealing in imported timber while living at Bristol and still undertaking railway contracts. His contracts with the South Devon Railway entailed him to build up a fleet of railway goods wagons. The Old Quay at Teignmouth was central to this work. A siding had been laid to it by the railway company in 1849, and the following year Hennet bought the quay itself and developed a small fleet of ships to carry coal and other goods. In 1852 he was appointed as one of the Harbour Commissioners.

Following the failure of the atmospheric system, the South Devon Railway was short of money. Hennet proposed that he rent land alongside the line and build goods depots. These were both for his own trade and also for general traffic handled by the railway. Depots were established at Exeter, Starcross, Dawlish, Teignmouth Eastcliff, Totnes, Rattery, Brent, Hemerdon, and Plymouth. At Stoneycombe he established a quarry on railway land and laid a siding to serve lime kilns that he built there. In addition, two stations were built and operated on behalf of the railway, at Exminster and Cornwood.

The goods shed at Plymouth was soon given to the railway company in exchange for rights at Exeter. The two stations, most of the remaining depots, and some of the wagons were sold to the railway in January 1857, the remainder being disposed of to other traders who continued to operate the depots and wagons for many years.

Sources

References

Great Western Railway people
English railway mechanical engineers
English civil engineers
People from Teignmouth
People from York
1799 births
1857 deaths
Engineers from Yorkshire